The 1920 California Golden Bears football team was an American football team that represented the University of California, Berkeley as a member of the Pacific Coast Conference (PCC) during the 1920 college football season. In their fifth year under head coach Andy Smith, the team compiled a 9–0 record (3–0 against PCC opponents), shut out seven of nine opponents, won the PCC championship, defeated Ohio State in the 1921 Rose Bowl, and outscored its opponents by a total of 510 to 14. 

There was no contemporaneous system in 1920 for determining a national champion. However, Cal was retroactively named as the national champion by the College Football Researchers Association, Helms Athletic Foundation, Houlgate System, National Championship Foundation, and Jeff Sagarin.

Olin C. Majors was the team captain. Guard Tim Callahan was a consensus first-team selection on the 1920 All-American football team. Two other players received All-America recognition: end Harold Muller (Newspaper Enterprise Association-1, Walter Camp-3) and tackle Dan McMillan (WC-2).

Schedule

References

California
California Golden Bears football seasons
College football national champions
Pac-12 Conference football champion seasons
Rose Bowl champion seasons
College football undefeated seasons
California Golden Bears football